Paula Gorycka (born 5 November 1990 in Kraków) is a Polish cross-country mountain biker. At the 2012 Summer Olympics, she competed in the Women's cross-country at Hadleigh Farm, finishing in 22nd place. She was on the start list of 2018 Cross-Country European Championships and finished 21.

References

Cross-country mountain bikers
Polish female cyclists
Living people
Olympic cyclists of Poland
Cyclists at the 2012 Summer Olympics
1990 births
Sportspeople from Kraków
Cyclists at the 2015 European Games
European Games competitors for Poland
21st-century Polish women